, often called as  or abbreviated to SDR, is a Japanese popular musical band formed in the late 1970s.

Members

Current members

Regular members 
 ; lead vocalist, guitarlist and MC talking
 ; vocalist and bassist
 ; vocalist and drummer
 ; vocalist and percussionist

Supporting members 
 ; vocalist and keyboardist
 ; vocalist, guitarlist and keyboardist

Former members 
 ; vocalist and keyboardist (1980-1994)
 ; vocalist and keyboardist (1998-2001)

History 
Since 1981, they've renamed the group as the present , because they desire to show various musical characteristics represented by a jazz standard song "Stardust" and ones of themselves in Revue-style performance.

In its 20th anniversary year of 2001, they toured all over Japan to hold concerts as usual, and then, on August 4, they performed no less than 101 pieces of music in a concert at the Tsumagoi Multipurpose Arena in Shizuoka, Japan. This performance has been recognized by the Guinness World Records as "the most pieces of music performed in 24 hours by a group."

Discography 
Within brackets are release dates.

Singles 
  (1981.5.25)
  (1981.11.28)
  (1982.5.25)
  (1983.10.26)
  (1984.5.25)
  (1985.1.25)
 Single Night (1985.9.25)
  (1986.3.25)
  (1986.6.25)
  (1986.10.25)
  (1987.2.25)
 One More Time (1987.6.10)
  (1987.10.25)
  / One More Time (1988.4.25)
  /  (1988.4.25)
  /  (1988.4.25)
  (1988.6.25)
  (1989.2.25)
  (1989.5.25)
 Be My Lady (1989.7.25)
 Lonely Snow Bird (1989.10.25)
  (1990.2.10)
  (1990.9.25)
  (1991.7.10)
  (1991.10.10)
  (1992.1.25)
  (1993.2.10)
  (1993.7.25)
  (1994.4.25)
  (1995.5.10)
  (1995.10.25)
 Get Up My Soul (1996.4.25)
  (1996.10.25)
  (1997.6.25)
  (1997.10.15)
  (1998.5.21)
  (1998.10.21)
  (1999.8.21)
  /  (2000.5.17)
 What is Love? (2000.11.29)
 My Love (2001.11.21)
 Joanna (2002.11.20)
 My pride,your pride/Step by step (2003.3.26)
  with CHAGE and ASKA (2003.9.10)
  with Yo Oizumi (2004.1.28 Hokkaido-limited edition, 2004.3.31 Nationwide edition)
 Find My Way (2004.7.28)
  (2004.10.27)
  (2005.5.25)
  (2006.1.25)
 Wake Up! My Heart (2007.3.21)
  (2007.7.25)
  (2008.8.27)
  (2009.11.18)
  (2010.7.21)
  (2012.2.22)

Albums

Original albums 
 STARDUST REVUE (1981.5.25)
  (1982.6.25)
  (1984.7.25)
 THANK YOU (1985.3.25)
 VOICE (1986.4.10)
 CHARMING (1986.12.10)
 NIGHT SONGS (1987.6.25)
 SUPER DONUTS (1987.11.28)
 RENDEZ-VOUS (1988.7.25)
 In The Sun, In The Shade (1989.7.10)
 ONE & MILLIONS (1990.10.3)
 Brightest! (1991.11.6)
 SOLA (1993.3.10)
  (1994.5.25)
  (1995.6.26)
 Ladies & Gentlemen (1996.7.8)
 Goodtimes & Badtimes (1997.11.5)
 Moody Blues (1998.11.5)
 DEVOTION (1999.11.20)
 Style (2002.1.1)
 Heaven (2003.4.23)
 AQUA (2004.9.29)
 31 (2007.9.5)
 ALWAYS (2008.11.19)
  (2009.9.16)

Best albums 
 Best Wishes (1990.5.25)
 LOVE SONGS (1994.11.30)
 STARS (2000.3.15)
 LOVE SONGS (2002.4.24)
 LOVE SONGS II (2002.4.24)
 Best Wishes (2002.5.22)
 HOT MENU (2006.3.1) - Certified as Gold award by RIAJ
 BLUE STARDUST (2009.5.27)
 RED STARDUST (2009.6.24)
 BLUE & RED STARDUST (2011.2.23)

Live recordings 
 FACE TO FACE (1992.10.25)
 SECRET FACE (1992.11.28)
 No Ballads (2001.7.25)
 FACE TO FACE (2002.5.22)
 SECRET FACE (2002.5.22)

References

External links 
Stardust Revue official website 
Imperial Records official website on Stardust Revue 

Musical groups established in 1979
Japanese rock music groups
Musical groups from Saitama Prefecture